The Elixir Aircraft Elixir is a 2010s French two-seat light aircraft designed and built by Elixir Aircraft. The aircraft conforms to the European Aviation Safety Agency Certification Standard CS-23.

The aircraft was announced at the Paris Air Show 2015 in the form of 2 models. The prototype was publicly unveiled during the 2017 edition of the airshow.

Its entry into service is expected following the award of the type certificate in March 2020.

Design and development 
The development of the aircraft began in 2015. The Elixir first flew on 31 August 2017 from La Rochelle Airport. The aircraft flew for about 40 minutes at around 5000 feet.

Starting from March 2018, another campaign of flight tests took place, with new objectives and another test pilot.

The Elixir is a two-seat cantilever low-wing monoplane made of carbon fiber. It has a T-tail and a fixed tricycle landing gear and side-by-side seating in an enclosed cabin. 

The Elixir is powered by a nose-mounted Rotax 912iSc 3 Sport engine with a three-bladed MT-Propeller tractor propeller. The aircraft has a Ballistic parachute for emergency use.

The initial aircraft production is at Périgny, next to La Rochelle. It is intended to move production to a new factory at La Rochelle airport

The production rate is going to be relatively reduced in a first time (10 to 12 aircraft the first year), before increasing in 2021 to reach 30 aircraft per year. The manufacturer hopes to reach a cadency of 100 aircraft per year around 2024.

Variants 
 NVFR
 IFR
 A more powerful version, equipped with the Rotax 915iS, mainly suited for travel.
 A version equipped with a towing hook, allowing glider towing.

See also
 https://elixir-aircraft.com/ company website

Specifications

References

2010s French civil utility aircraft
Single-engined tractor aircraft
Low-wing aircraft
Aircraft first flown in 2017